Richard James Kane (November 12, 1954 – December 25, 2009) was an American football running back in the National Football League for the Detroit Lions in 1977-1983 and 1985-1986. Kane rushed for 1,486 yards during his NFL career.

Biography
Kane was born on November 12, 1954 in Lincoln, Nebraska to Gerald and Anne Kane. He had one sister, Diane. The family moved to Pleasanton, California when Kane was 12, and he played football at and graduated from Amador Valley High School. He attended University of Oregon for two years and was awarded the Len Casanova Award for Rookie of the year in 1973. He transferred to San Jose State University where he became the first player in school history to rush 1,000 yards. 

Kane was drafted by the Detroit Lions in the third round (69th overall) of the 1977 NFL draft, where he remained for the majority of his career. He played 12 games with the Washington Redskins during the 1984 season after being placed on waivers by the Lions. The following May, he was again placed on waivers but re-signed with the Lions on a one-year contract. He was released in February 1986.

After retiring from football, Kane worked as a car salesman in Reno, Nevada. In 2005, a teenage girl using her cell phone crashed into his motorcycle, resulting in the loss of his leg. He and his wife Dianne had three sons and one daughter. He died December 25, 2009 in Reno, Nevada due to complications from pneumonia. His funeral was held at a Church of Jesus Christ of Latter-day Saints meetinghouse in Reno.

College statistics

Professional career statistics

References

1954 births
2009 deaths
Sportspeople from Lincoln, Nebraska
American football running backs
Oregon Ducks football players
San Jose State Spartans football players
Detroit Lions players
Washington Redskins players
American amputees
Deaths from pneumonia in Nevada
People from Pleasanton, California